Canaan is a town in Litchfield County, Connecticut, United States. The population was 1,080 at the 2020 census, down from 1,234 at the 2010 census. The town of Canaan is often referred to locally by the name of its principal settlement, Falls Village.

Geography
Canaan is in northwestern Litchfield County; it is bordered to the north by the town of North Canaan, to the east by Norfolk, to the south by Cornwall, and to the west, across the Housatonic River, by Salisbury.

Principal communities
Falls Village (town center)
Huntsville
Lower City
South Canaan

History
The town was incorporated in 1739. The name "Canaan" is derived from Hebrew.

Demographics

As of the census of 2000, there were 1,081 people, 445 households, and 298 families residing in the town. There were 610 housing units at an average density of 18.5 per square mile (7.1/km). The racial makeup of the town was 97.04% White, 1.48% Black or African American, 0.19% Asian, 0.09% Pacific Islander, 0.37% from other races, and 0.83% from two or more races. Hispanic or Latino people of any race were 0.37% of the population.

There were 445 households, out of which 30.3% had children under the age of 18 living with them, 57.8% were married couples living together, 7.2% had a female householder with no husband present, and 33.0% were non-families. 27.6% of all households were made up of individuals, and 10.6% had someone living alone who was 65 years of age or older.  The average household size was 2.43 and the average family size was 2.97.

In the town, the population was spread out, with 23.6% under the age of 18, 5.9% from 18 to 24, 27.5% from 25 to 44, 28.8% from 45 to 64, and 14.2% who were 65 years of age or older.  The median age was 42 years. For every 100 females, there were 95.1 males.  For every 100 females age 18 and over, there were 98.6 males.

The median income for a household in the town was $54,688, and the median income for a family was $62,500. Males had a median income of $40,438 versus $29,219 for females. The per capita income for the town was $35,841.  About 3.0% of families and 4.7% of the population were below the poverty line, including 5.6% of those under age 18 and 3.8% of those age 65 or over.

Education

Canaan is a member of Regional School District 1, which also includes the towns of Cornwall, Kent, North Canaan, Salisbury, and Sharon.  Public school students attend Lee H. Kellogg School for grades K–8, and Housatonic Valley Regional High School for grades 9–12.

Notable people
Philo Belden, Wisconsin politician
Steve Blass, former Major League Baseball pitcher and current broadcaster
Major Felten, artist and illustrator
James Mars, slave narrative author
Judson Philips, author of mystery novels
Cyrus Prindle, abolitionist and one of the founders of the Wesleyan Church
Lemuel Roberts, Revolutionary War soldier and historian, born in Canaan in 1755
Catherine Roraback, civil rights attorney
Bates Turner, Vermont politician and jurist
Elizur Wright, the "father of life insurance"

Transportation
The town is served by U.S. Route 7, Route 63, and Route 126. US 7 leads north into Massachusetts and south to Danbury, while Route 63 leads southeast to Litchfield. Route 126 is a local road that passes through the center of Falls Village and runs north along the Housatonic River.

Pictures

References

External links

Town of Canaan official website
Northwest Connecticut Arts Council
Northwest Connecticut Convention and Visitors Bureau

 
Towns in Litchfield County, Connecticut
Canaan (town), Connecticut
Towns in the New York metropolitan area
Towns in Connecticut